Calonarius cupreorufus is a species of fungus in the family Cortinariaceae.

Taxonomy 
It was first described in 1994 by the mycologist Tor Erik Brandrud who classified it as Cortinarius cupreorufus.

In 2022 the species was transferred from Cortinarius and reclassified as Calonarius cupreorufus based on genomic data.

Habitat and distribution 
It is native to Europe.

References

External links

cupreorufus
Fungi of Europe